Vikkas Manaktala is an Indian television actor known for portraying Cadet Amar Huda in Left Right Left and Gangadhar Rao in Jhansi Ki Rani. In 2022, he was seen in Bigg Boss 16 as a wild card contestant and got evicted after three weeks.

Career

Manaktala started as a ramp model. Later, he joined television in 2006 portraying Cadet Amardeep "Amar" Huda in Sony SAB's Left Right Left until 2008.

After a five-year break, he made his comeback in 2013 playing Sameer Verma/Aditya Jagannadh in Main Naa Bhoolungi on Sony Entertainment Television, opposite Aishwarya Sakhuja. In 2016, he acted as Neel Sharma in Yeh Hai Aashiqui.

The next year, Manaktala appeared as Veer Pratap in Life OK's Ghulaam alongside Param Singh and Niti Taylor. Then he portrayed Gangadhar Rao in Color's historical drama Jhansi Ki Rani opposite Anushka Sen and Balveer in &TV's Laal Ishq opposite wife Gunjan Walia. Next, he joined the cast of Star Plus's Namah as Shiva.

In 2022, Manaktala entered the Colors TV's reality TV show Bigg Boss 16 as a wild card contestant. He was evicted on day 90, finishing at 13th place.

Television

Awards

References

External links

 
 

Living people
Punjabi people
Indian male television actors
Indian male soap opera actors
Year of birth missing (living people)